Laura Fusetti (born 8 October 1990) is an Italian footballer who plays as midfielder and defender for A.C. Milan in the Serie A.

Career

Club
Fusetti started playing football with the men's oratory team. At the age of thirteen, she moved to the women's team of Tradate Abbiate. In 2009, Fusetti signed with Como 2000 where in her last season she wore the captain's armband. In the summer of 2017, she moved to  Brescia, giving her the opportunity to make her debut in the UEFA Women's Champions League.

In 2018 she moved to newly formed A.C. Milan Women.

International
In July 2008, Fusetti won the UEFA Women's Under-19 Championship with the Italian team, playing four games in the final phase. She was also part of the squad that represented Italy at the UEFA Women's Euro 2017.

References

External links 

 Player's Profile at Football.it
 Player's Profile at UEFA
 
 Fusetti's Profile at Brescia Official Website

1990 births
Living people
People from Segrate
Italy women's international footballers
Italian women's footballers
Women's association football midfielders
Women's association football defenders
A.C.F. Brescia Calcio Femminile players
A.C. Milan Women players
2019 FIFA Women's World Cup players
Footballers from Lombardy
Sportspeople from the Metropolitan City of Milan
S.S.D. F.C. Como Women players
UEFA Women's Euro 2017 players